

Locksbrook Cemetery is a municipal cemetery located in Lower Weston, Bath, England. It was opened in 1864 as Walcot Cemetery, and occupies , originally serving the parishes of Walcot, Weston and St Saviour's. The cemetery was closed for general use in 1937 with over 30,000 interments there, though additional burials in existing graves continue. The majority of the cemetery was for about 29,500 burials from Walcot parish, with the north of the cemetery for Weston and St Saviour parishes.

Nowadays it is designated as a 'Nature Conservation Site' by Bath and North East Somerset council, its owners. The cemetery has several unusual species of tree including Phillyrea latifolia, Sequoiadendron giganteum, Ailanthus altissima, Thuja plicata and Japanese Cherry.

Listed structures
There are five Grade II listed structures in the cemetery:
 Gothic entrance Lodge
 Main entrance gate piers and boundary walls
 Twin mortuary chapels (north chapel Church of England, south chapel non-conformist) with bell tower and linking arcade
 Bronze sarcophagus with angel by Edward Onslow Ford
 Cross of Sacrifice, amongst World War I graves

Military graves

A total of 122 military graves in the cemetery are in the care of the Commonwealth War Graves Commission, 90 of which are from World War I, 44 forming a war graves plot (mainly hospital deaths, many from the nearby Bath War Hospital), and 32 from World War II whose graves are dispersed around the cemetery. Locksbrook Cemetery is the final resting place of:
 Herbert Taylor Reade VC
 George Alexander Renny  VC
 William Francis Frederick Waller  VC

Gallery

See also
 Locksbrook

References

External links
 

Cemeteries in Bath, Somerset
Grade II listed buildings in Bath, Somerset
1864 establishments in England